Mizrock is Miz's second Japanese album and contains the a-sides and b-sides to the last three singles before it: In The Sky, Backseat Baby, and Bittersweet. This album revolves more around rock (hence the name Mizrock) and jerkier tunes. The English version of New Day (bonus track on the limited edition) is the same as the one in Dreams. The English version of the track In The Sky, previously known as Amazing, was used in the Square-Enix game Grandia III.

Track listing
"Bittersweet"
"Eyes Don't Lie"
"In The Sky"
"Backseat Baby"
"An Ordinary Day"
"What Difference"
"Dreamer"
"Give It All Away"
"In The Rain"
"Yesterday"
"Part Of My Balance"
"Welcome To Our Party"
"In My Life"

Bonus tracks
"New Day" - English Version
"In The Sky" - English Version

Limited Edition DVD
Backseat Baby (music clip)
Bittersweet" (music clip)
Bittersweet making of
Bittersweet + Mizrock photo session

2006 albums
Victor Entertainment albums